Doug Jones may refer to:

Sports
 Doug Jones (American football) (born 1950)
 Doug Jones (baseball) (1957–2021), American
 Doug Jones (boxer) (1937–2017), American
 Doug Jones (curler), American

Others
 Doug Jones (actor) (born 1960), American actor
 Doug Jones (international arbitrator) (born 1949), Australian lawyer
 Doug Jones (politician) (born 1954), former U.S. senator from Alabama
  Doug Jones, a character in the 2021 film No Sudden Move

See also 
 Douglas Jones (disambiguation)
 List of people with surname Jones